J̌ (minuscule: ǰ) is a letter of the Latin alphabet, derived from J with the addition of a caron (háček). It is used in some phonetic transcription schemes, e.g. ISO 9, to represent the sound . It is also used in the Latin scripts or in the romanization of various Iranian and Pamir languages (Avestan, Pashto,  Yaghnobi, and others), Armenian, Georgian, Berber/Tuareg, and Classical Mongolian. The letter was invented by Lepsius in his Standard Alphabet on the model of š and ž to avoid the confusion caused by the ambiguous pronunciation of the letter j in European languages.

References

Latin letters with diacritics
Phonetic transcription symbols